Private Schools Athletic Association  (PRISAA), founded on February 17, 1953, is an association of private schools, Christian schools, and home school athletic departments throughout the Philippines.

The PRISAA exist to bring exposure and credibility to private schools across the nation. The PRISAA accomplishes this with tournaments, national rankings, player/coaching awards and recruiting services.

History

Palarong Pambansa veteran Lorendale Echavez made waves in her debut in the Private Schools Athletic Association (PRISAA) National Games Sunday by snaring 2 gold medals to highlight hostilities at the Joaquin Enriquez Memorial Sports Complex (JEMSC) in Zamboanga City. The 17-year-old University of San Carlos biology freshman won the women's 200-meter freestyle in 2 minutes and 15.31 seconds, sinking the 3-year-old record of 2:24.69 set also here by Chrizel Lagunday.

Regular Sports

2017 PRISAA National Games

It was first announced that the 2017 PRISAA National games will be held at Isabela, Cagayan, but because Cagayan was devastated by Typhoon, the PRISAA National games was forced to move the tournament to Iba, Zambales.

Sporting Venues

Medal Tally

PRISAA National Games host cities

Mutya ng PRISAA (National Level)

Host Cities Ratings

See also
2018 PRISAA National Games

References 

Student sport in the Philippines